This is a list of characters from the 2019 Chinese television series Go Go Squid!.

Main cast

Tong Nian
Portrayed by Yang Zi a talented computer major who is also a popular online singer. She is optimistic, cheerful, soft, and cute. She is very obedient, attentive, and very sensible. She is attending the youth class at the university and has the same high IQ as the male lead Han Shangyan.  After she fell in love with Han Shangyan at first sight, she chose to take the initiative to approach each other and bravely pursue love, but she did not do so blindly. Although Tong Nian loved Han Shangyan very much, she couldn't extricate herself without falling in  love and have her own dreams and pursuits.

Han Shangyan/Gun
Portrayed by Li Xian a computer genius, a high-cold e-sports idol. Han is a legend in the e-sports world. He has climbed to the top, has fallen through the trough, and has experienced strong winds and waves. He was originally the only investor and main member of the Solo team. Has won more than ten international championships, including multiple personal world rankings, the most dominant player with two MVP. After exiting the team, he established the K & K club. His dream is to take the club's young players to attack the world champion of cybersecurity CTF competitions. Other than that, he has nothing else in his eyes. In the eyes of his teammates, he is "the boss who is not close to women".

He is persistent in his dreams and sticks to his beliefs, but he has some physical deficiencies in many of the outside world’s warmth and coldness. Maintaining a sense of vigilance and distance, this has a great relationship with his native family growing environment. Han Shangyan grew up with his grandfather and stepmother. His parents are deceased.  His mother died giving birth to him.  His father died a few years after remarriage, leaving his stepmother to bring him up (episode 13). Although he grew up with his grandfather, although he gained a lot of love, the relationship was ambivalent, fraught with misunderstanding. Parents' feelings are different. Father's words and lessons, and the company of his mother, can make a person's character grow fully, and Han Shangyan's childhood lacked these precious things. Like a prince of ice, he is very good at many things. Maintaining indifference and vigilance, he developed a meticulous and serious attitude towards life. And this is exactly what his family left him with. His “don’t care” about anything other than work is in stark contrast to his fanatical pursuit of career ideals; privately, he secretly covers the players’ quilts and cares about their lives. He has fascinated a lot of girls, but he has not been interested in dating.

Supporting cast
 Wu Bai/DT, portrayed by Hu Yitian, is Han's cousin. He is the current top CTF player known as DT and part of the K&K team. Wu Bai is a very quiet guy who likes to be alone but highly dependable. He has a liking for Ai Qing since high school. He is the number one strong player in China, and also an excellent computer genius. It has always been his dream and perseverance to win the championship with teammates and fight for and maintain team honor.
 Mi Shaofei/Xiao Mi, portrayed by Lee Hong-chi, a retired CTF player who wants to make a comeback to gaming. He also used to be part of Team Solo and has a close relationship with Han as well as Solo. Later, he was invited by Solo to come back under SP, but he announced his retirement because of his unsatisfactory results. He was later convinced by Su Cheng to join Team K&K as a team manager.
 Ai Qing / Appledog, portrayed by Wang Zhen'er is the team manager for Team SP. She is regarded as the "goddess" of the gaming scene. Wang Hao's ex-girlfriend
 Wang Hao/Solo, portrayed by Li Zefeng, is the representative of the China branch of SP Gaming. He is heavily involved in SP's CTF team. Solo used to be the captain of Team Solo which had achieved good results nationally. He is a single father to a 10-year-old daughter, Xiao Ai.
 Sun Ya Ya, portrayed by Jiang Peiyao, is Tong Nian's good friend as well as dormitory mate. She is also a CTF fan and loves Team Solo, especially Shao Fei.
 Su Cheng is K&K's team manager in China. Her husband is Nan Wei who helped Han to establish K&K Club and handles its operations in its Norway headquarters. Su Cheng and Solo used to be lovers and Xiao Ai is her daughter.
 Ou Qiang/All, portrayed by Chen Xijun is the only one of the 5 partners in Team Solo who is still competing under the username All. He is part of Team SP and has a cheerful personality.
 Grandpa Han, portrayed by Paul Chun, is Han and Wu Bai's grandfather. He often quarrels with Han but cares a lot about him. He likes to play matchmaker to his grandson because he wants to see him settle down happily.
 Grunt / Shen Zhe, portrayed by Wen Yifan, Vice-Captain of Team K&K. He has a poisonous mouth but a soft heart.
 97 / Ling Shan, portrayed by Li Mingde, main defender of Team K&K. A bright and talkative guy who loves to tease Demo.
 One / Zhou Yi, portrayed by Xu Yuexiao, Sub-defender of Team K&K. The tallest in the team.
 Demo / Dai Feng, portrayed by Yu Chengen, Sub-attacker of Team K&K. The youngest in the team, he has a cute and blur personality.
 Tong Nian's mother, portrayed by Sun Lin.
 Tong Nian's father, portrayed by Wang Ce.
 Xiao Ai portrayed by Zhang Ge, is Solo's daughter. She has a hearing problem and uses a hearing aid. While Solo dotes on her, Xiao Ai is undergoing a rebellious streak as she grows up. She is cocky and hates her mother.
 Lan Mei, portrayed by Shi Qingyan, Tong Nian's close friend. A popular online singer (NetEaseCloudMusic).

Special appearance
 Han Jia Jia, portrayed by Liang Aiqi, Han Shangyan's step-mother. She treats Han Shangyan as her own.
 Zhou Xiaohai, portrayed by Zhou Xiaohei, Tong Nian's professor and Han Shangyan's friend.

References

Go Go Squid